Lee Kwang-kuk (born 1975) is a South Korean film director and screenwriter. An acclaimed indie filmmaker who was a former assistant director to Hong Sang-soo, Lee debuted with Romance Joe (2011), and has since directed another two features A Matter of Interpretation (2014) and A Tiger in Winter (2017).

Career 
Born in 1975, Lee graduated with a degree in film from the Seoul Institute of the Arts. He was a former assistant director to Hong Sang-soo before he made his feature debut with Romance Joe (2011) where it made its world premiere and won Citizen Reviewers' Award at the 16th Busan International Film Festival in 2011.

Filmography 
Tale of Cinema (2005) - directing dept
Woman on the Beach (2006) - assistant director
Like You Know It All (2009) - assistant director
Hahaha (2010) - assistant director
Romance Joe (2011) - director, screenwriter
Hard to Say (short film, 2013) - director, screenwriter, producer 
A Matter of Interpretation (2014) - director, screenwriter, producer
If You Were Me (omnibus film, 2016) - director, screenwriter, producer
A Tiger in Winter (2017) - director, screenwriter, producer

Awards 
2012 21st Buil Film Awards: Best New Director (Romance Joe)
2012 13th Busan Film Critics Awards: Best Screenplay (Romance Joe)

References

External links 
 
 
 

1975 births
Living people
South Korean film directors
South Korean screenwriters